Legacy of Blood is a 1987 adventure module for the Dungeons & Dragons roleplaying game.  Its module code is CM9 and its TSR product code is TSR 9210.

Plot summary
Legacy of Blood is an adventure in which one of the player characters has inherited rulership of Fenholm, and must deal with the challenges this brings.

The player character's cousin Rolph is dead, and as his heir, the player character was willed his dominion: Fenhold. The Deep Swamp is threatening to engulf all of this new holding. People are seeing ghosts, disappearing without reason, and crops are suddenly blighted. The farmers don't like the swampdwellers, the swampdwellers don't like the farmers, and no one likes the halflings. It is the player character's task to make all this shipshape once again.

Publication history
CM9 Legacy of Blood was written by Steve Perrin and Katharine Kerr, with a cover by Clyde Caldwell, and was published by TSR in 1987 as a 32-page booklet with an outer folder.

Credits
Steve Perrin: Design
Katharine Kerr: Design
Heike Kubasch: Editing
Clyde Caldwell: Cover art
Eric A. Gehlin: Interior art
Betty Elmore: Typesetting
Stephanie Tabat: Cartography
Susan R. Myers: Cartography
Gloria Habriga: Cartography
David C. Sutherland III: Cartography
Jon Jacobsen: Original cartography

Reception

See also
 List of Dungeons & Dragons modules

References

External links
The "CM" modules from The Acaeum

Dungeons & Dragons modules
Mystara
Role-playing game supplements introduced in 1987